Warhammer Age of Sigmar: Storm Ground is a turn-based strategy game developed by Gasket Games and published by Focus Home Interactive in collaboration with Games Workshop. Based on the Warhammer: Age of Sigmar miniature wargame, the game released for Windows, Nintendo Switch, PlayStation 4 and Xbox One on May 27, 2021.

Gameplay
Age of Sigmar: Storm Ground is a turn-based strategy game. It features three different factions: the Stormcast Eternals, the Nighthaunt and the Maggotkin. Each faction has their own unique hero units and characteristics. For instance, the Stormcast Eternals are equipped with sturdy armor, making them hard to kill, while the Maggotkin can change the landscape of a map. In a hex map, players can cast spells and perform various ranged and melee attacks with their units. As the player progresses, they can unlock new weapons, armor, and spells for their units and heroes. Unlocks may also show up in a hex as items stored inside loot containers. In addition to a campaign mode, which incorporates elements commonly found in roguelike games, the game also features online competitive multiplayer modes.

Development
The game is developed by Gasket Games, a video game development studio based in Vancouver, Canada. The team included veterans who previously worked on the Dawn of War series at Relic Entertainment, and Homeworld: Deserts of Kharak at Blackbird Interactive. It is the first video game adaptation of the Age of Sigmar universe. Despite this, Games Workshop gave Gasket Games freedom to create new lore and story that add to the Black Library.

Publisher Focus Home Interactive first announced the partnership with Gasket Games in April 2019. The game was officially announced during Gamescom: Opening Night Live in August 2020. The game is set to be released on May 27, 2021 for Windows, PlayStation 4, Xbox One and Nintendo Switch.

Reception 
Warhammer Age of Sigmar: Storm Ground received "mixed or average" reviews for Microsoft Windows and PlayStation 4, according to review aggregator Metacritic.

References

External links
 

2021 video games
Warhammer Fantasy video games
Windows games
PlayStation 4 games
Nintendo Switch games
Xbox One games
Turn-based strategy video games
Video games developed in Canada
Focus Entertainment games